James Daniel Welsh (October 9, 1902 – October 20, 1970), was a Major League Baseball player who played outfielder from -. Welsh played for the Boston Braves and New York Giants.

Welsh was traded, along with Shanty Hogan from the Braves to the Giants on January 10, 1928 for future Hall Of Famer Rogers Hornsby.  The Giants would send Welsh back to the Braves the following year in exchange for Doc Farrell.

In 715 games over 6 seasons, Welsh posted a .290 batting average (778-for-2684) with 387 runs, 35 home runs, and 288 RBI. He finished his career with a .971 fielding percentage, having played all three outfield positions and a few games at first and second base.

External links

1902 births
1970 deaths
Major League Baseball outfielders
Baseball players from Colorado
Boston Braves players
New York Giants (NL) players